Daniel Rygel (born 16 November 1979) is a Czech former football midfielder, who played 12 matches in the Gambrinus liga for Bohemians Prague. He is the son of footballer Zdeněk Rygel.

References

External links
  90minut.pl Profile

Living people
1979 births
Czech footballers
Czech First League players
Bohemians 1905 players
MFK Vítkovice players
Odra Wodzisław Śląski players
Expatriate footballers in Poland
Czech expatriate sportspeople in Poland
Association football midfielders